Eduardo Ignacio Leal Delgado (born 5 June 1991), known as Eduardo Leal, is a Chilean footballer currently playing for San Antonio Unido of the Segunda División de Chile.

Notes

External links
 
 

1991 births
Living people
Chilean footballers
Chile international footballers
Club Deportivo Palestino footballers
Club Deportivo Universidad Católica footballers
Deportes Valdivia footballers
Deportes Copiapó footballers
A.C. Barnechea footballers
Lota Schwager footballers
Chilean Primera División players
Association football midfielders